The Bundaberg Region is a local government area in the Wide Bay–Burnett region of Queensland, Australia, about  north of Brisbane, the state capital. It is centred on the city of Bundaberg, and also contains a significant rural area surrounding the city. It was created in 2008 from a merger of the City of Bundaberg with the Shires of Burnett, Isis and Kolan.

The Bundaberg Regional Council, which administers the Region, has an estimated operating budget of A$89 million.

History 
Prior to the 2008 amalgamation, the Bundaberg Region existed as four distinct local government areas:

 the City of Bundaberg;
 the Shire of Burnett;
 the Shire of Isis;
 and the Shire of Kolan.

Local government in the Bundaberg area began on 11 November 1879 with the creation of 74 divisions around Queensland under the Divisional Boards Act 1879. These included the Barolin, Burrum and Kolan divisions.

The first eight years saw several areas break away and become self-governing due to increases in local population. Areas to the south (Woongarra) and north (Gooburrum) of the Burnett River split from Kolan on 31 December 1885, and Barolin on 30 January 1886 respectively, while on 1 January 1887, the Isis Division further to the south split away from Burrum. Thus by 1887, the Municipality of Bundaberg and the Barolin, Gooburrum, Isis, Kolan and Woongarra Divisions covered the entire territory of what is now the Bundaberg Region.

On 31 March 1903, after the passage of the Local Authorities Act 1902, the Municipality became a Town while the Divisions became Shires. On 22 November 1913, Bundaberg was proclaimed a City.

On 21 December 1917, the Shire of Barolin was abolished and its area split between the City of Bundaberg and the Shire of Woongarra.

On 21 November 1991, the Electoral and Administrative Review Commission, created two years earlier, produced its second report, and recommended that local government boundaries in the Bundaberg area be rationalised. The Local Government (Bundaberg and Burnett) Regulation 1993 was gazetted on 17 December 1993, and on 30 March 1994, the Shires of Gooburrum and Woongarra were abolished, with most transferred into a new Shire of Burnett. A portion of Woongarra was transferred to the City, more than doubling its area and increasing its population by 8,200 in 1991 census terms.

On 15 March 2008, under the Local Government (Reform Implementation) Act 2007 passed by the Parliament of Queensland on 10 August 2007, the City of Bundaberg merged with the Shires of Burnett, Isis and Kolan to form the Bundaberg Region.

Divisions and councillors
Although the Commission recommended the council be undivided with ten councillors and a mayor, the gazetted form was that of 10 divisions each electing a single councillor, plus a mayor representing the whole region.

Those elected at the 2020 local government elections were as follows:

 Mayor: Jack Dempsey
 Division 1 Councillor: Jason Bartels
 Division 2 Councillor: Bill Trevor OAM
 Division 3 Councillor: Wayne Honor
 Division 4 Councillor: Tracey McPhee
 Division 5 Councillor: Greg Barnes
 Division 6 Councillor: Tanya McLoughlin
 Division 7 Councillor: Vince Habermann OAM
 Division 8 Councillor: Steve Cooper
 Division 9 Councillor: May Mitchell
 Division 10 Councillor: John Learmonth

Mayors

Suburbs
The Bundaberg Region includes the following settlements:

Inner Bundaberg area:
 Ashfield
 Avenell Heights
 Avoca
 Branyan
 Bundaberg Central
 Bundaberg East
 Bundaberg North
 Bundaberg South
 Bundaberg West
 Kensington
 Kepnock
 Millbank
 Norville
 Svensson Heights
 Thabeban
 Walkervale
Outer Bundaberg-Burnett area:
 Burnett Heads
 Mon Repos
 Bargara
 Coral Cove
 Elliott Heads
 Innes Park
 Kalkie
 Qunaba
 Rubyanna
 Windermere

Kolan area:
 Gin Gin
 Bullyard
 Bungadoo
 Dalysford
 Delan
 Gaeta
 Horse Camp
 Kalpowar
 Maroondan
 McIlwraith
 Moolboolaman
 Morganville
 Tirroan
 Wallaville
North and West Burnett area:
 Abbotsford
 Avondale
 Bucca
 Fairymead
 Gooburrum
 Littabella
 Meadowvale
 Miara
 Moore Park
 Moorland
 Oakwood
 Rosedale1
 Sharon
 South Kolan
 Watalgan
 Waterloo
 Welcome Creek
 Winfield
 Yandaran

Isis area:
 Childers
 Apple Tree Creek
 Booyal
 Buxton
 Cordalba
 Doolbi
 Farnsfield
 Goodwood
 Horton
 Isis Central
 Kullogum
 North Isis
 Redridge
 South Isis
 Woodgate
Other Burnett area:
 Alloway
 Calavos
 Coonarr
 Electra
 Elliott
 Givelda
 Kinkuna
 Pine Creek
 Port of Bundaberg
 South Bingera
 Woongarra

1 – split with Gladstone Region

Population
The populations given relate to the component entities prior to 2008.

* The population of the 1996 area of Bundaberg in 1991 was 41,219.

Libraries 
The Bundaberg Regional Council operate public libraries in Bundaberg Central, Childers, Gin Gin, and Woodgate Beach.

References

External links
 
 ECQ map of divisions

 
Bundaberg
Local government areas of Queensland
2008 establishments in Australia